The corsula (Rhinomugil corsula) is a species of ray-finned fish from the grey mullet family Mugilidae. It is found in the rivers and estuaries of southern Asia, in India, Bangladesh, Nepal and Myanmar. It is presently regarded as the only species in the monospecific genus Rhinomugil.

References

Mugilidae
Fish described in 1822